is a Japanese slice of life romance shōjo manga series written and illustrated by Ai Minase and serialized on Shogakukan's Shōjo Comic magazine. 12 volumes were published. It is published in France by Panini.

Characters
Koharu Shiina
Natsuki Sugiura
Aki Saionji

Volumes
1 (November 26, 2012)
2 (December 26, 2012)
3 (March 26, 2013)
4 (June 26, 2013)
5 (September 26, 2013)
6 (January 24, 2014)
7 (March 26, 2014)
8 (July 25, 2014)
9 (September 26, 2014)
10 (December 26, 2014)
11 (March 26, 2015)
12 (August 26, 2015)

Reception
Volume 1 reached the 35th place on the weekly Oricon manga chart and, as of December 2, 2012, has sold 25,522 copies; volume 2 reached the 41st place and, as of December 30, 2012, has sold 27,923 copies; volume 5 reached the 16th place  and, as of October 6, 2013, has sold 71,993 copies; volume 6 reached the 11th place and, as of February 2, 2014, has sold 76,972 copies; volume 7 reached the 12th place and, as of April 6, 2014, has sold 92,459 copies; volume 8 reached the 20th place and, as of August 3, 2014, has sold 76,089 copies; volume 9 reached the 26th place and, as of October 5, 2014, has sold 73,490 copies; volume 11 reached the 17th place and, as of April 5, 2015, had sold 81,481 copies.

The staff at manga-news.com gave the French edition a grade of 16 out of 20. On Manga Sanctuary, one of the staff members gave it a grade of 5 out of 10.

References

2012 manga
Romance anime and manga
Shogakukan manga
Shōjo manga
Slice of life anime and manga